Andrei Aleksandrovich Polin (born 8 February 1994) is a Russian football player.

He made his debut in the Russian Football National League for FC Tyumen on 23 August 2015 in a game against FC Baikal Irkutsk.

References

External links
 Profile by Russian Football National League

1994 births
Footballers from Moscow
Living people
Russian footballers
Association football midfielders
FC Tyumen players
FC Solyaris Moscow players
FC Arsenal Tula players
FC Sportakademklub Moscow players